This page is about noun phrases in Hungarian grammar.

Syntax
The order of elements in the noun phrase is always determiner, adjective, noun.

Grammatical marking
With a few important exceptions, Hungarian does not have grammatical gender or a grammatical distinction between animate and inanimate.

Plurality
Hungarian nouns are marked for number: singular or plural.

However, Hungarian uses the plural form sparsely for nouns, i.e. only if quantity is not otherwise marked. Therefore, the plural is not used with numerals or quantity expressions. Examples: öt fiú ("five boy"); sok fiú ("many boy"); fiúk ("boys").

In phrases that refer to existence/availability of entities, rather than their quantity, the singular is used in Hungarian (unlike in English): Van szék a szobában "There are chairs in the room", Nincs szék a szobában "There aren't chairs in the room" or "there is no chair in the room". (The singular may be considered as partitive here.) Also, product names are usually written out in the singular, e.g. Lámpa "Lamps".

Hungarian also uses a singular noun when the possessor is plural but the thing possessed is singular, e.g. a fejünk ("our heads" or "each-one-of-us's head", where each person has one head: English speakers might colloquially say "each of our heads", even though taken literally this could only be said by a multi-headed person).

The plural noun marker is the suffix -ok/(-ak)/-ek/-ök/-k.

Before possessive suffixes, the plural k appears as ai or ei, e.g.:

 (lakás vs) lakások ("flats/apartments")
 (lakásom vs) lakásaim ("my flats/apartments")

When used predicatively, adjectives are also marked for number (see adjective marking). The suffix is -ak/-ek/-k.

Pairs of body parts
Hungarian uses paired body parts in the singular, even if the pair is meant together, and even if several people's pairs of body parts are meant. One piece of a pair is described as: "egyik lába" ("one of his legs"). As can be seen, pairs of body parts are considered as one in Hungarian.

Note the number of the noun in the following examples:

Note: if one wants to emphasize the third case (where both legs of each person involved), the actual plural number (Tánc közben összegabalyodtak a lábaik, lit. "their legs") might also be used, but the above (singular) option can fully suffice in this case, as well.

Apparent plural endings and homonymy

The letter k also occurs at the end of certain words, which thus may appear plural. Examples include emlék ("a [piece of] memory"), farok ("tail"), köldök ("navel"), könyök ("elbow"), sarok ("corner"/"heel"), pocok ("vole"), püspök ("bishop"), érsek ("archbishop"), szemöldök ("eyebrow"), zsák ("sack") etc. – the name of the mole used to be vakondok but this form took on a plural meaning and the word is mostly used today as vakond.

Homonymy may occur between a word in the singular and another in the plural. Examples:

Person

Forms for "you"
(There are some older forms for you, like kend, which is still used in rural areas.) See in more detail: T-V distinction for Hungarian.

The polite 2nd person forms ön and maga take the grammatical forms of the 3rd person, e.g. for verbs and possessive suffixes.

Impersonal usage
Hungarian does not have a distinct impersonal or generic pronoun (cf. English "one"), but there are two ways of expressing this:
 The 3rd person plural (cf. English "they"), for example . ("They say the girl is crazy.")
 The phrase az ember (lit. "the human"), for example . ("You'd never think of it.")

Determiners

Articles
Hungarian has definite and indefinite articles. The definite article, a, changes to az before a vowel. The indefinite article is egy [pronounced with a long final consonant], an unstressed version of the word for the number "one". Articles are invariable (i.e. not marked for number, case, etc.)

Differences in using the definite article
The definite article "a(z)" is applied more commonly than in English, for example in general statements, even before uncountable nouns, e.g. A szerelem csodálatos ("Love is wonderful"), and with plural nouns, e.g. A kiskutyák aranyosak ("Puppies are cute"). The latter sentence can thus have two meanings, either referring to specific dogs or puppies in general. However, in a semi-specific sense (when "some" could be inserted in English) the article is omitted in Hungarian, e.g. Ceruzákat tett az asztalra ("S/he put [some] pencils on the desk").

"A(z)" is used before holidays, when referring to a forthcoming or recent event (A karácsonyt a rokonokkal töltjük "We'll spend Christmas with the relatives") and also when referring to companies (A Coca Colánál dolgozik "S/he works for Coca Cola").

"A(z)" is used before names of months and days of the week in a general sense (Kedvenc hónapom a május, kedvenc napom a szombat "My favorite month is May and my favorite day is Saturday.") However, it's omitted in statements about the current month or day, with the verb van/volt/lesz (Aznap szombat volt "It was Saturday that day", Holnap már május van "It's May tomorrow").

This article is also used after ez/az as a determiner ("this, that"), e.g. ez a szék ("this chair"), as well as (usually) before the possession (az asztalom or az én asztalom "my desk").

Differences in using the zero article
No article is normally used (especially in literary language):
 before indefinite noun phrases as predicates, e.g. A nővérem tanár ("My elder sister is [a] teacher"),
 before "theatre" and "cinema" (színházba/moziba megy "go to the theatre/cinema") unless a specific, particular venue is meant,
 in "have" statements before the indefinite possession, especially if the number is unimportant or unknown, e.g. Van gyerekük? ("Do you have children?", literally, "Do you have [a] child?") or Van nálam toll ("I have a pen / pens with me") and
 before the subject in "there is" constructions, especially in a sentence-initial position, e.g. Szellem van a konyhában ("There is [a] ghost in the kitchen").

Before country names
The definite article is used before country names in the following cases:
 when it comprises an adjective formed with -i: a Dél-afrikai Köztársaság [Republic of South Africa], a Dominikai Közösség, a Dominikai Köztársaság, a Kongói Köztársaság, a Kongói Demokratikus Köztársaság, a Közép-afrikai Köztársaság [Central Africal Republic], a Zöld-foki Köztársaság [Cape Verde], including the longer names of countries which comprise an adjective with "-i", e.g. a Kínai Népköztársaság "the People's Republic of China"
 which are formally in the plural: az (Amerikai) Egyesült Államok [USA], az Egyesült Arab Emírségek [UAE], and the short form a Bahamák (~ a Bahama-szigetek) 
 including the plural form szigetek ("islands") at the end of the name: a Bahama-szigetek, a Comore-szigetek, a Fidzsi-szigetek, a Fülöp-szigetek [the Philippines], a Saint Vincent és a Grenadine-szigetek, a Salamon-szigetek, a Maldív-szigetek, a Marshall-szigetek, a Seychelle-szigetek,
 and before the names az Egyesült Királyság [UK] and a Vatikán.

(Note: the Gambia and the Netherlands are no exceptions; they have no article in Hungarian.)

Other proper nouns
Cities never have articles in Hungarian (not even The Hague, simply Hága).

In contrast with English, "the" is used before the following types:
 streets, squares, and parks (a Váci utca "Váci Street", a Central Park)
 public buildings (a canterburyi  katedrális), including railway stations and airports (a Waterloo pályaudvar "Waterloo Station")
 bridges (a Szabadság híd "Freedom Bridge")
 hills and mountains (a Gellért-hegy "Gellért Hill", a Mount Everest)
 woods, forests, gardens, and valleys (a Szilícium-völgy "Silicon Valley")
 lakes, bays, and gulfs (a Balaton "Lake Balaton", az Ontario-tó "Lake Ontario", a Hudson-öböl "Hudson Bay")
 islands and peninsulas (a Margit-sziget "Margaret Island")
 and planets (a Mars, a Szaturnusz, a Jupiter).

As a result, a Niger refers to the river while Niger refers to the country. People can colloquially say a Móriczon találkozunk (literally "we'll meet on the Móricz"), where the definite article indicates the square as opposed to the person (Zsigmond Móricz). Also, Japán on its own refers to the country while a japán can refer to a Japanese person or thing.

Demonstrative determiners
The demonstrative determiners (often inaccurately called demonstrative adjectives in English) are ez a/ez az ("this") and az a/az az ("that").

Numerals
Hungarian numbers follow an extremely regular, decimal format. There are distinct words for 1 to 9, 10, 20, 30, 100, 1000 and 1000000. The tens from 40 to 90 are formed by adding -van/-ven to the digit. When the numbers 10 and 20 are followed by a digit, they are suffixed with -on/-en/-ön/-n (on the oblique stem). Compound numbers are formed simply by joining the elements together. Examples:
öt ("five")
tíz ("ten")
tizenöt ("fifteen")
ötvenöt ("fifty-five")
százötvenöt ("one hundred and fifty-five")

As in English, a number can function as a determiner or as a stand-alone noun. As a noun it can take all the usual suffixes.

Suffixes used only on numerals  and hány ("how many?"):
-odik/(-adik)/-edik/-ödik for ordinal numbers, e.g. ötödik ("the fifth")
-od/(-ad)/-ed/-öd for fractional numbers, e.g. ötöd ("a fifth")
-os/(-as)/-es/-ös for adjectival numbers (numeric adjectives), e.g. ötös

The numeric adjectives do not have an exact equivalent in English. They are used when English uses a construction such as "bus number 11": a tizenegyes busz, "room 303": a háromszázhármas szoba.

Quantity expressions
Suffixes used specifically with numerals, hány ("how many?") and other quantity expressions:
-szor/-szer/-ször for how many times, e.g. ötször ("five times"), sokszor ("many times")
-féle and -fajta for "kind(s) of", e.g. ötfajta ("five kinds of")
-an/-en/-n for numeric adverbs 

The use of the adverbs suffixed with -an/-en/-n is best illustrated by examples: Sokan voltunk. ("There were a lot of us.") Öten vannak. ("There are 5 of them.") Ketten mentünk. ("Two of us went.")

Possession

Possessive suffixes
In Hungarian, pronominal possession is expressed by suffixes applied to the noun. The following suffixes are used for singular nouns:

The following suffixes are used for plural nouns:

The háza, házai type (i.e., like the one with a singular possessor) is used in the 3rd person plural except when no pronoun or only the ő is present before it, e.g. a szülők háza "the parents' house". In other words, the plural -k of the 3rd person suffix is left from the noun if there is a lexical possessor preceding it.

The definite article is usually used. It can be omitted in a poetic or literary style. It may also be omitted at the beginning of the sentence in colloquial speech.

The possessor can be emphasized by adding the subject pronoun, e.g. az én házam ("my house"). In this case the definite article must be used. For the 3rd person plural, the 3rd person singular pronoun is used, e.g. az ő házuk (not az ők házuk).

Words with -j
Certain consonant-final stems always use the suffixes with -j for a singular noun with a 3rd person singular possessor, e.g. kalap ("hat"): kalapja ("his/her hat"). This group also uses the -j for a singular noun with a 3rd person plural possessor, e.g. kalapjuk ("their hat"). The -j is also inserted for a plural noun (with a possessor of whichever person and number), e.g. kalapjaim ("my hats"), kalapjaid ("your (sg. fam.) hats"), kalapjai ("his hats"), etc.

The two most common types are the following:

There is much variance, but in general, the -j variant is usually safer than the variant without -j, except with the specific endings listed above. (Usually the variant without -j is more traditional and the one with -j is more recent.)

Where a form applies the j, the other forms will apply it too. An exception is the uncommon type of barát ("friend") where the -j type is incorrect with a plural noun: barátja ("his/her friend"), barátjuk ("their friend") but barátaik ("their friends"), without j. The other most common examples of this type are előd, 'predecessor', and utód, 'successor'. However, there are areas where the -j type is correct for these words too.

Word endings and suffix types
Several endings (c, cs, dzs, sz, z, s, zs, j, ny, ty, gy, h, i.e., affricates, spirants, palatal/ized sounds and h) only allow the variant without -j in both singular and plural, as shown in the charts above. On the other hand, the words that always take the -j variant form a rather small group: only those ending in f or ch.

For the other endings, there are no clear-cut rules (so these forms are to be learnt one by one), but there are some regularities. Words with a long vowel or another consonant preceding the ending consonant often take the -j variant, as well as international words (e.g. programja, oxigénje, fesztiválja "his/her program, oxygen, festival"). Vowel-dropping and vowel-shortening stems always use the variant without -j, just like most words using -a as linking vowel (e.g. házat, házak "house": háza "his/her house").

The endings v, l, r, m, g, k usually take the variant without -j (e.g. gyereke, asztala "his/her child, table"), but a minority among them take it (e.g. hangja, diákja "his/her voice, student" but again könyve, száma "his/her book, number").
For words ending in n, p, t, the regularities are basically similar, but there is wide variance. Words ending in -at/-et (a suffix), however, usually take the variant without -j.
The majority of words ending in b, d use the -j suffix (e.g. darabja, családja "his/her/its piece, family" but lába, térde "his/her leg, knee").

Apparent possessive suffixes and homonymy

Certain words (with or without suffixes) have endings which are identical with a possessive suffix. Examples:

Notes:
For the  →  change, see Oblique noun stem.
For the apa → ,  →  change, see Oblique noun stem.
For the plural marked with "[s]" in "your [pl.] eye[s]", see Pairs of body parts.
For the different link vowels after words taken as absolute or relative stems (like  and  here), see The accusative suffix after other suffixes.

A similar kind of homonymy may arise with vowel-dropping words (see the  type under Oblique noun stem). Examples:

Note that the first person singular possessive form of hal (fish) is not the above halom but exceptionally halam, cf. a link vowel.

Examples:
A kiskutya bepiszkította az almát. (The puppy soiled its litter OR the apple.)
Bedobta az érmét a folyóba. (He/she threw his/her medal OR the coin into the river.)
A macskának fontos a karma. (Its claws OR the karma is/are important for a cat.)

Finally, another kind of homonymy may arise between a noun with a possessive suffix and a verb: hasad "your stomach (belly)" or "it tears/rips", árad "your price" or "it floods", fogad "your tooth" or "he/she/it receives/accepts"/"he/she/it bets".

Possessive construction with 2 nouns
There are 2 possible forms for a possessive construction with 2 nouns. In both of them the noun which is possessed takes the 3rd person possessive suffix.
The possessor is an unsuffixed noun, e.g. István lakása ("István's flat/apartment")
The possessor is a noun suffixed with -nak/-nek and the possessed noun is preceded by a/az, e.g. Istvánnak a lakása ("István's flat/apartment")

The first form is used as default and the second is used to emphasize the possessor or for clarity. It also enables the possessor to be moved within the sentence, e.g. Ennek a lakásnak sehogy se találom a kulcsát ("I can't possibly find the key of this flat/apartment"). Note the sehogy se találom ("I can't possibly find") wedged in between the parts of the possessive structure.

If the 3rd person plural possessor is a lexical word, not a pronoun (thus the plurality is marked on it), the possession will be marked like the 3rd person singular: a szülők lakása (not a szülők lakásuk) ("the parents' flat/apartment"). In other words, the plurality of the 3rd person plural possession is only marked once: either on the possessor (in the case of lexical words) or on the possession (in the case of pronouns), cf. az ő lakásuk (above).

Possessive pronouns
The following pronouns are used to replace singular nouns:

Note: Where two variants are given, the one with a long vowel is more literary.

The following pronouns are used to replace plural nouns:

-é/-éi to replace possessed noun
The suffixes -é/-éi are used to express possession when the noun is not stated:
Istváné: "Istvan's", for singular noun: "the thing belonging to Istvan",
Istvánéi: "Istvan's", for plural noun: "the things belonging to Istvan".

Hence comes the unusual vowel sequence: fiaiéi, which means "those belonging to his/her sons". Fia- (his/her son) -i- (several sons) -é- (belonging to) -i (several possessions).

The suffixes are also used to form the question word kié ("whose?").

Positional suffixes
Hungarian follows a strict logic for suffixes relating to position. The position can be "in", "on" or "by". The direction can be static (no movement), movement towards or movement away. Combining these gives 9 different options.

Note 1: -nál/-nél is also used with the meaning "at the home of" (cf. French chez, German bei). 

Note 2: -ban/-ben is sometimes pronounced without the final n, this however, carries a connotation of rural or unsophisticated speech.

Town/city names
For town/city names, the rules for selecting the right group are as follows:
Towns outside the historical Kingdom of Hungary (i.e., towns that don't have a native Hungarian name) use the -ban/-ben group
Most towns within Hungary use the -on/-en/-ön/-n group
Approx. fifty towns within Hungary use the -ban/-ben group
This group includes all town names ending in -n, -ny and -város ("city/town"), most with -m, -i and some with -r. For example, Sopronban, Debrecenben; Gárdonyban; Dunaújvárosban; Esztergomban, Komáromban, Veszprémben; Zamárdiban; Egerben, Győrben

A few towns within Hungary traditionally use a different ending, -ott/-ett/-ött/-t, for position, see locative case for examples. This locative, however, always can be replaced by one of the above suffixes. Those towns that can also use the -on/-en/-ön/-n group (e.g. Pécsett or Pécsen) use -ra/-re and -ról/-ről for movement. Győr, however, where the alternative form is with -ban/-ben, uses -ba/-be and -ból/-ből for movement.

Differentiating place names with suffix groups
The difference of the two suffix group may carry a difference in meaning:

The below cases may exemplify the above tendencies but in actual usage they are not always followed as strictly as described:
Tajvanon means "on (the island of) Taiwan" but Tajvanban is "in (the country of) Taiwan" (here the usage is parallel to English) – Note: Tajvanon may also refer to the country
Tolnán means "in (the town of) Tolna" but Tolnában is "in the county of Tolna" – Note: Tolnában may also refer to the town
Velencén means "in the Hungarian town of Velence" but Velencében is "in the Italian city of Venice (in Hungarian: Velence)" – Note: Velencében may also refer to the Hungarian town

Insider and outsider usage

There may also be difference between "insider" and "outsider" usage: one may prefer the suffixes expressing the "interior" relation and the others those expressing the "surface" relation (the difference extends to the suffixes of static position and those of the two kinds of movement).

In some cases, the local usage is encouraged based on traditional usage in literature and linguistic history, e.g. Csíkszeredában (instead of Csíkszeredán) as well as Nagyszombatban (instead of Nagyszombaton, which coincides with the form "on Holy Saturday"). In other cases, the "outsider" usage is considered more received or even normative, for example:

Cases and other noun suffixes

A note on terminology
The concept of grammatical cases was first used in the description of Ancient Greek and Latin grammar, which are fusional languages. Over the centuries the terminology was also used to describe other languages, with very different grammatical structures from Indo-European languages. Some linguists believe that the concept does not fit agglutinative languages very well. Rather than using the "case" paradigm and terminology for describing Hungarian grammar, they prefer to use the terms "(case) suffixes" and "endings". Despite these opinions, nowadays the term "case" is used by most Hungarian linguists.

The criterion for an ending to be a case (according to today's generative linguistic grammars of Hungarian) is that a word with that ending can be a compulsory argument of a verb. This difference is usually unimportant for average learners of the language.

However, it is useful to know that only actual cases can follow other suffixes of the word (such as the plural or the possessive suffix) and the other noun endings can only be added to absolute stems. For example, lakás-om-mal exists ("with my flat/apartment"), but *lakás-om-ostul doesn't.

Case endings

Assimilation works with -val/-vel and -vá/-vé: the initial sound of these suffixes will change to the preceding sound, if it is a consonant other than v, e.g. lakás + -val appears as lakással. (In words ending in a vowel or v, there is no change, e.g. sáv·val "with the lane", hajó·val "with the ship".)

Accusative suffix
After -l, -r, -j, -ly, -n, -ny, -s, -sz, -z and -zs, the accusative suffix is usually added directly to the noun rather than using a link vowel, e.g. lakást. For the other consonants, a link vowel is used.

The accusative suffix after other suffixes
As shown in the above chart, -ot/(-at)/-et/-öt/-t is the accusative suffix for nouns with no other suffix. However, if the accusative suffix is added to a relative stem, that is, to a noun which already has another suffix (i.e. a plural or possessive suffix), -at/-et is used. Examples:

Sometimes the quality of the link vowel of the accusative can differentiate between otherwise homonymous words:

Accusative without marking
The accusative can be expressed without the -t morpheme after the first and second person possessive suffixes (especially in the singular). For example:

Látom a kalapod. or Látom a kalapodat. "I [can] see your hat."
Látod a kalapom. or Látod a kalapomat. "You [can] see my hat."

The accusative personal pronouns engem ("me") and téged ("you") are also used without the -t suffix (engemet and tégedet are rather infrequent).

The third case where the accusative remains unmarked is the infinitive, e.g. Szeretek kirándulni ("I like hiking", lit. "I like to hike"). (When the same meaning is expressed with a derived noun, the accusative -t appears: Szeretem a kirándulást.)

Apparent accusative endings and homonymy

The letter t also occurs at the end of certain words which thus may appear accusative. Examples include eset ("case"), falat ("a bit of food"), hét ("week"), kabát ("coat"), kert ("garden"), kötet ("volume" [of books]), lakat ("padlock"), lapát ("shovel"), part ("shore", "bank", "coast"), párt ("party"), sajt ("cheese") etc.

Telling them apart:

Homonymy may also arise between accusative nouns and verbs, e.g. választ may mean "answer" (n, acc.) or "s/he chooses/elects" and nevet may mean "name" (n, acc., from név) or "s/he laughs".

The accusative of terem ("room"/"hall") is termet (see vowel-dropping) instead of the regular teremet (which could come from tér with vowel-shortening, meaning "my square", acc.). On the other hand, teremt means "s/he creates". Termet is another homonymy as it may be another word in the nominative ("stature"). – This latter bunch of examples shows eloquently that knowing stem types and recognizing them are essential for interpreting a Hungarian word correctly.

Other noun endings

Notes:
For more examples of the endings, refer to the article List of grammatical cases.
The special status of the genitive case can be illustrated with the following example: "the key of the flat/apartment" is a lakás kulcsa or a lakásnak a kulcsa (nominative or dative case). The case marking is on the possessed object rather than the possessor.

Incorrect classifications
The following endings are sometimes counted as cases, but are in fact derivational suffixes, see Adjectives and adverbs

Slight noun irregularities

a/e/o/ö lengthening before suffixes
Words ending in a, e, o or ö become lengthened before most suffixes:

The asterisk means that almák/körték (the plural) and almám/körtém (the possessive forms) can be suffixed further, e.g. almákat, almáknak etc., almámat, almádat, almáját etc., almáimat, almáidat, almáit etc., almámnak, almádnak, almájának etc.

Those cases with small letters can be formed, but they are not meaningful, unless figuratively (e. g. Oslók lit. means "Oslos", but naturally Oslo doesn't have plural, although the case technically can be formed; Oslóul means "as an Oslo", which is also dubious).

The suffix -ként is an exception as it doesn't lengthen the a/e, e.g. almaként, körteként. Compounds don't lengthen the vowel, either, e.g. almalé, körtelé ("apple/pear juice").

Otherwise, this rule extends to all nouns and adjectives, e.g. Coca-Cola → Coca-Colát, Coca-Colának etc.

Short o and ö endings only occur with foreign words (like Oslo and Malmö above) since Hungarian or Hungarianized words lengthen these vowels at the end of the word, e.g. euró, metró, videó, sztereó, fotó, diszkó etc.

a link vowel
Certain back-vowel nouns, e.g. ház ("house"), always use the vowel a as a link vowel where the link vowel is usually -o/-e/-ö, except with the superessive case -on/-en/-ön/-n.

The link vowel -o/(-a)/-e/-ö occurs with the following suffixes:
-ok/(-ak)/-ek/-ök/-k for noun plurals, e.g. házak ("houses")
-om/(-am)/-em/-öm/-m for 1st singular possessive, e.g. házam ("my house")
-od/(-ad)/-ed/-öd/-d for 2nd singular possessive, e.g. házad ("your (singular) house")
-otok/(-atok)/-etek/-ötök/-tok/-tek/-tök for 2nd plural possessive, e.g. házatok ("your (plural) house")
-ot/(-at)/-et/-öt/-t for accusative case, e.g. házat ("house")
-onként/(-anként)/-enként/-önként/-nként, e.g. házanként ("per house")
-ostul/(-astul)/-estül/-östül/-stul/-stül, e.g. házastul ("together with the house")
-odik/(-adik)/-edik/-ödik for ordinal numbers, e.g. nyolcadik ("the  eighth")
-od/(-ad)/-ed/-öd for fractional numbers, e.g. nyolcad ("an eighth")
-os/(-as)/-es/-ös for adjectival numbers, e.g. nyolcas ("number eight")
-onta/(-ante)/-ente/-önte for distributive occasions, e.g. nyaranta ("every summer", from nyár "summer")

Theoretical:
-ott/(-att)/-ett/-ött/-t for position

This irregularity sometimes help differentiate between otherwise homonymous verbs and nouns:

The case of nyúl is similar ("rabbit" or "he reaches out") except that it becomes short in the plural as a noun (nyulak, cf. the hét type) and remains long as a verb (nyúlok). Beside árak (the plural of the a stem word ár, "price") árok also exists ("ditch"). Finally, beside vágyak ("desires"), vágyok may also occur as a verb ("I desire") although it is expressed as vágyom in standard Hungarian (cf. -ik verbs).

Oblique noun stem
Some nouns have an alternative stem which is used with certain suffixes. This is most commonly derived from the main stem by shortening or elision of the final vowel. A few nouns insert the letter "v" to derive the oblique stem.

It is used with the following suffixes:

Note: as with other nouns, the plural and the possessive forms (the first seven rows) are independent of cases so they can take the suffixes of other cases than the nominative: hetek|ből, dolgom|hoz, dolgaimhoz etc. The forms in the latter five rows (which have suffixes of certain cases) cannot have more suffixes attached.

Stem with -on/-en/-ön/-n
For -on/-en/-ön/-n, the vowel-shortening base uses the nominative stem, e.g. héten, but the other types (vowel-dropping and -v- bases) use the oblique stem, e.g. dolgon, tavon, as it is shown in the examples above.

Also, the back-vowel nouns which use an a link vowel have o as the link vowel instead, e.g. házon ("on the house").

As noted above, when it is added to tíz ("ten") and to húsz ("twenty") to form compound numbers, e.g. tizenegy ("eleven"), huszonegy ("twenty-one"), these vowel-shortening bases use the oblique stem.

Differentiating -an/-en from -on/-en/-ön/-n
The suffix -an/-en, used with numbers and adjectives, is not to be confused with the above suffix -on/-en/-ön/-n. Their vowel can only be a or e, even on words which would normally use o or ö: cf. ötön (on the number five) and öten (numbering five), haton and hatan (for the latter form, see Quantity expressions).

Order of noun suffixes
Where more than one type of noun suffix occurs, the plural suffix is first (normally -k but -i with possessives). The possessive suffix follows this and the case suffix is last.

Pronominal forms

Demonstrative pronouns
The demonstrative pronouns are ez ("this") and az ("that"). They can take the full range of case endings. For most suffixes, preservative consonant assimilation occurs.

Subject and object pronouns
Pronouns exist in subject (nominative) and object (accusative) forms.

Because the verb suffix is marked for both subject and object, the pronouns are not usually used, i.e. it is a pro-drop language. The pronouns are used for contrast or emphasis or when there is no verb.

Hence, the English pronoun "you" can have no fewer than thirteen translations in Hungarian.

Cases with personal suffixes
For the other forms which are listed above as cases, the equivalent of a pronoun is formed using a stem derived from the suffix, followed by the personal suffix. For example, benned ("in you") or for emphasis tebenned ("in you") has the stem benn- which is derived from the front variant of the position suffix -ban/-ben ("in").

Note: When the stem ends in a long vowel, the 3rd person singular has a ∅ suffix.

maga and ön do not use these forms. They are conjugated like nouns with the case suffixes, e.g. magában, önben.

Suffixes that use a back vowel stem:

Suffixes that use a front vowel stem:

No personal forms exist for the other suffixes: -vá/-vé, -ig, -ként, -ul/-ül, -stul/-stül, -onként/(-anként)/-enként/-önként/-nként, -ott/(-att)/-ett/-ött/-t, -onta/(-anta)/-ente/-önte, -kor. Their personal variants can be only paraphrases (e.g. addig ment, ahol ő állt "he went as far as him" > "… as far as where he stood").

Postpositions with personal suffixes
Most postpositions (see there) are combined with personal suffixes in a similar way, e.g. alattad ("under you").

Note: The personal forms of stand-alone postpositions are paraphrases, e.g. rajtam túl "beyond me", hozzám képest "as compared to me".

Personal suffixes at the end of postpositions:

See also the section Overview of personal endings: typical sound elements.

Note:
In the same way as for the cases with personal suffixes, when the postposition (stem) ends in a long vowel, the 3rd person singular has a ∅ suffix (see the bolded forms in the last row).
Postpositions in bare (unsuffixed) forms are capitalized.

Postpositions with three-way distinction

Postpositions without three-way distinction

Derived postpositions with possessive suffixes
These below are declined like words with possessive suffixes plus cases:

Részére and számára are often interchangeable. To express sending or giving something (to someone), usually részére is preferred. On the other hand, to express the affected party of some perception or judgement (good, bad, new, shocking, unacceptable etc. for someone), only számára can be used, as well as when expressing goal, objective, intention, or other figurative purposes.

Placeholders in Hungarian
See Placeholder names in Hungarian

Duplication with demonstrative determiners
When the noun has a plural suffix, a "case" suffix or a postposition, this is duplicated on the demonstrative. As with the demonstrative pronouns, for most suffixes, preservative consonant assimilation also occurs. Examples:

As peripheral phenomena, there also exist non-duplicating forms, like e, ezen, eme, azon and ama (the latter two referring to distant objects), but they are poetic or obsolete (cf. "yonder"). For example: e házban = eme házban = ebben a házban ("in this house"). Ezen and azon are used before vowel-initial words, e.g. ezen emberek = ezek az emberek ("these people"). The duplicating forms (as in the chart above) are far more widespread than these.

External links 
 HungarianReference.com's section on noun cases Guide to Hungarian noun cases
  Galla után szabadon – új magyar automatikus nyelvtan: jokes on stem words appearing as those having certain suffixes (used as a source in this article)

 Noun phrase
Noun phrases